Mister Scarface is a 1976 noir -action film directed by Fernando Di Leo and starring Jack Palance.

Plot 
Tony (Harry Baer) is a mob loan collector who is unsatisfied with his position in life, and constantly dreams of living it rich in Brazil with his brother. To make some quick cash, Tony joins the forces of organized crime, making his way up the ladder. Together with Napoli, another mob enforcer, Tony hatches a plan to con mob boss Manzari (Palance) out of a fortune, but Manzari isn't about to let that happen.

Cast 
Harry Baer as Tony
Al Cliver as Ric  
Jack Palance as Manzari aka "Mr. Scarface"
Vittorio Caprioli as Vincenzo Napoli
Gisela Hahn as Clara
Edmund Purdom as Luigi Cerchio
Enzo Pulcrano as Peppi
Carmelo Reale (as Roberto Reale) as Luca
Peter Berling as Valentino

Production
Mister Scarface was the last film produced by Daunia 80 Cinematografica, the independent film company that had financed all of director Fernando di Leo's previous films starting with Naked Violence, with the exception of Shoot First, Die Later and Kidnap Syndicate. The film was shot at De Paolis in Rome and on location in Rome.

Release
Mister Scarface was distributed theatrically in Italy by Over Seas Film Company on 3 December 1976. It grossed a total of 333,059,400 Italian lire domestically. It was later released in West Germany as Zwei Supertypen raumen auf in Germany on 9 December 1977 with an 88-minute running time.

The dialogue is extensively sampled in the track Strong Face by Cestrian.

References

Footnotes

Sources

External links

1976 films
1976 crime films
1970s action thriller films
Italian action thriller films
Poliziotteschi films
Films directed by Fernando Di Leo
West German films
Films scored by Luis Bacalov
1970s Italian films